Sudden Impact is a 1983 American vigilante action thriller film, the fourth in the Dirty Harry series, directed, produced by and starring Clint Eastwood (making it the only Dirty Harry film to be directed by Eastwood himself) and co-starring Sondra Locke. The film tells the story of a gang rape victim (Locke) who decides to seek revenge on the rapists ten years after the attack by killing them one by one. Inspector Callahan (Eastwood), famous for his unconventional and often brutal crime-fighting tactics, is tasked with tracking down the serial killer.

The film is notable for the catchphrase "Go ahead, make my day", written by John Milius and uttered by Clint Eastwood's gun-wielding character in the beginning of the film as he stares down an armed robber who is holding a hostage.

Plot
In 1973, artist Jennifer Spencer and her sister, Beth, are gang-raped. The attack leaves Beth in a catatonic state. Ten years later, an enraged Spencer seeks revenge and kills George Wilburn, one of the rapists. She then moves to the town of San Paulo, looking for the remaining criminals.

Meanwhile, Inspector Harry Callahan is frustrated when a judge yet again dismisses a case due to his lawless methods. At his favorite diner, he foils a robbery, killing three criminals in the process. Callahan later causes powerful crime lord Threlkis to suffer a fatal heart attack, after threatening him with prosecution in a murder case.

Unable to fire him because his methods "get results", Callahan's superiors instead order him to take a vacation. However, his relaxation is short-lived when four of Threlkis's hitmen attack him. Callahan gets to dispatch three, while the fourth one escapes. Later, the suspect from the dismissed case and his friends throw Molotov cocktails into his car. Acting in self-defense, he manages to cause his attackers to crash their car into the bay and die instantly. Callahan's supervisor, Lieutenant Donnelly, immediately sends him to San Paulo to investigate the Wilburn murder.

Upon arriving in San Paulo, Callahan chases down a robber. The reckless but successful pursuit draws the anger of the local police. While jogging with his bulldog Meathead, Callahan accidentally runs into Spencer. While being less than thrilled, she feels no anger toward Callahan. Upon returning to his room at a motel, he is targeted by the surviving Threlkis hitman, who fails and gets killed by the inspector. Meanwhile, Spencer kills a second rapist, Kruger, at the beach. Callahan recognizes the modus operandi, but local police chief Lester Jannings refuses to work with him.

Callahan learns that the victims are friends of Jannings' son, Alby. Ray Parkins, the female member of the gang of rapists, figures out that they are being targeted and warns the remaining two, Tyrone and Mick. At an outdoor cafe, Callahan meets Spencer again. Over drinks, he learns that she shares his emphasis on results over methods when seeking justice. But, the inspector adds the caveat "'til it breaks the law." Callahan reveals that he is investigating Wilburn's murder, which rattles Spencer. Later, he finds Tyrone dead. To be more protected, Mick stays with Parkins at her place. While visiting them for questioning, Callahan is attacked by Mick. After he subdues Mick and takes him to the police station, Spencer arrives and guns down Parkins.

Callahan and Spencer meet again and sleep together. On his way out, Callahan notices her car, which he had seen earlier at Parkins' house, and soon finds Parkins' body. Eddie and Carl bail Mick out of jail. Meanwhile, policeman Horace arrives at Callahan's motel to celebrate the easing of tensions in San Francisco. He meets Mick and his henchmen instead, who have been waiting to spring an ambush, and gets killed. Mick's gang then neuter Meathead with a switchblade and beat up Callahan before throwing him into the ocean.

Spencer arrives at the Jannings home with the intention of killing Alby, who was one of the rapists. To her surprise, Alby, like her sister, is catatonic. A guilty conscience caused him to attempt suicide, which left him with permanent brain damage. Jannings admits that, to protect his reputation and his only child, he failed to jail the guilty parties. He convinces Spencer to spare Alby's life and promises that Mick will be punished. Mick and the others, however, arrive and capture Spencer, killing Jannings with her .38.

Enraged at what Mick's gang have done to Horace and Meathead, Callahan goes after them. The gang brings Spencer to the boardwalk for another rape, but are startled by Callahan's apparent return from the dead. After killing Eddie and Carl, Callahan chases Mick, who absconds with Spencer atop a rollercoaster. There, Spencer breaks free and Callahan shoots Mick down. He falls from the top of the coaster, crashing through the structure below and is impaled on a carousel horse.

The police arrive and find Spencer's .38 on Mick; ballistics, Callahan states, will prove that "his gun … was used in all the killings." A compassionate Callahan and a vindicated Spencer leave the crime scene together.

Cast

Production
The screenplay was initially written by Charles B. Pierce and Earl E. Smith for a separate film for Locke, but was later adapted into a Dirty Harry film by Joseph Stinson. Filming occurred in spring 1983. Many of the film's scenes were filmed in San Francisco and Santa Cruz, California. The scene where Harry chases a bank robber in the downtown business district offers a rare glimpse of the area before it was devastated by the Loma Prieta earthquake of October 17, 1989. Footage for the robbery in "Acorn Cafe" was shot at Burger Island, later a McDonald's and now the site of a hotel, at the corner of 3rd and Townsend in San Francisco. At this point in his career, Eastwood was receiving a salary that included 60% of all film profits, leaving the other 40% for the studio. Estimates had Eastwood earning $30 million for Sudden Impact.

It was Locke's last film to have theatrical distribution. Part of a career-long pattern that saw her playing female protagonists much younger than herself, at 39 Locke was older than all the actors playing her rapists, and 21 years older than the youth catcalling her near the start of the movie. She was six years older than Audrie Neenan, even though the character of Parkins is clearly meant to be older than Spencer. The actress who played Locke's sister was eleven years her junior. Further, Locke was only seven years younger than the art gallery curator who calls her "child" during their short scene together.

Reception

Box office
In its opening weekend the film took $9,688,561 in 1,530 theaters in the US. In total in the US and Canada, the film made $67,642,693, making it the highest grossing of the five films in the Dirty Harry franchise. The film also surpassed the $63.6 million gross of Thunderball (1965) to become the highest-grossing fourth installment of a film in the United States and Canada. Worldwide, it grossed more than $150 million.

Critical response
Review aggregation website Rotten Tomatoes retrospectively gave the film a score of 57% based on 37 reviews. The consensus reads: "Sudden Impact delivers all the firepower – and the most enduring catchphrase – fans associate with the Dirty Harry franchise, but it's far from the best film in the series."

Vincent Canby criticized the film, stating "The screenplay is ridiculous, and Mr. Eastwood's direction of it primitive, which is surprising because he has shown himself capable in such films as The Outlaw Josey Wales and The Gauntlet. Among other things, the movie never gets a firm hold on its own continuity. Sometimes scenes of simultaneous action appear to take place weeks or maybe months apart." Roger Ebert was more positive, awarding three stars out of four; while noting that the film was "implausible" with "a cardboard villain", he also praised it as "a Dirty Harry movie with only the good parts left in" and "a great audience picture." Variety noted that "everything is pitched for maximum action impact, so audiences should feel they got their money's worth," but also thought that the action scenes put "too much reliance on characters, particularly Harry, being in the right place at the right time." Gene Siskel of the Chicago Tribune gave the film two stars out of four and wrote that nothing in the Dirty Harry sequels "has ever come close to the evil Scorpio in its portrayal of a bad guy. Because of that they are lesser films. We never feel that Harry is in any real danger." Kevin Thomas of the Los Angeles Times slammed the film as "the exploitation picture at its most nakedly manipulative," which "doesn't just exploit sex and violence but also audience prejudices toward minorities. (True, Callahan's partner, played by Albert Popwell, is black, but he's around only briefly.) That it exploits with sleek cinematic skill—not to mention a great deal of righteousness—makes it all the more reprehensible." A negative review from Pauline Kael in The New Yorker remarked that the film "might be mistaken for parody if the sledgehammer-slow pacing didn't tell you that the director (Eastwood) wasn't in on the joke."

Legacy
Sudden Impact is best remembered for Harry's catchphrase, "Go ahead, make my day". United States President Ronald Reagan used the "make my day" line in a March 1985 speech threatening to veto legislation raising taxes. When campaigning for office as mayor of Carmel-by-the-Sea, California, in 1986, Eastwood used bumper stickers entitled "Go Ahead — Make Me Mayor".

The film is recognized by American Film Institute in these lists:
 2005: AFI's 100 Years...100 Movie Quotes:
 Harry Callahan: "Go ahead, make my day." – #6

"Make My Day" is a novelty song recorded by American country music artist T. G. Sheppard featuring Clint Eastwood.  It was released in February 1984 as the second single from the album Slow Burn. The song reached #12 on the Billboard Hot Country Singles & Tracks chart.  The song was written by Dewayne Blackwell.

See also 

 Dirty Harry (1971)
 Magnum Force (1973)
 The Enforcer (1976)
 The Dead Pool (1988)

References

Bibliography

External links

 
 
 
 

1983 films
1983 action thriller films
American action thriller films
American sequel films
Dirty Harry
Fictional portrayals of the San Francisco Police Department
Films about dogs
Films set in California
Films set in the Las Vegas Valley
Films set in San Francisco
Films set in the San Francisco Bay Area
Films set in 1973
Films set in 1983
Films shot in San Francisco
American police detective films
American rape and revenge films
American vigilante films
Films scored by Lalo Schifrin
Films directed by Clint Eastwood
Films produced by Clint Eastwood
1980s English-language films
1980s American films